Donato Coco is an Italian car designer born in Foggia, Italy in 1956. He is known for designing automobiles for Citroën, but even more well-known for designing some of Ferrari's recent cars.

Coco was Lotus Head of Design from 2009 to November 2014. 

His works include:
 Ferrari 458
 Ferrari California 
 Citroën Xsara Picasso
Citroën C3 Lumière concept, Citroën C3 Air concept and Citroën C3 Pluriel concept
 Citroën C2
Citröen C1
 Citroën C3
Citroën C3 Pluriel
 Citroën C4
Ocqueteau RC10

References

Italian automobile designers
Living people
1956 births